John Warren (by 1488 – 1547), of Dover, Kent, was an English politician and a member of parliament.

Career
Warren was a Member of Parliament for Dover in 1510, 1512, 1515, 1536, 1542 and 1545.

References

15th-century births
1547 deaths
Members of the Parliament of England for Dover
English MPs 1510
English MPs 1512–1514
English MPs 1536
English MPs 1515
English MPs 1542–1544
English MPs 1545–1547